Evdokiya Ivanivna Gogotsky (1823–1888), was a Ukrainian public figure and philanthropist. She was a leading women's rights activist in the Ukraine, particularly active within the efforts to provide women with more professional and educational possibilities, and was one of the founders of the Women's Higher Courses in Kyiv (1879).

References 

 Ольга Друг . Примітки до книги: Паталєєв О. В. Старий Київ. Зі спогадів Старого грішника. — К.: Либідь, 2008 — с. 331.

1823 births
1888 deaths
19th-century Ukrainian people
Ukrainian women's rights activists
19th-century Ukrainian women
Ukrainian philanthropists
19th-century women philanthropists